A U.S. Representative represents the United States or is a representative to the United States.

U.S. Representative may refer to:
 a member of the U.S. House of Representatives, who is colloquially called a "U.S. Representative", a "Member of the House", or a "U.S. Congressman".
 The U.S. Trade Representative